Olav Mosebekk (13 September 1910 – 1 December 2001) was a Norwegian graphic artist, illustrator and painter.

Biography
He was born at Kongsberg in Buskerud, Norway. 
His parents were Ole Thorkelsen Mosebekk (Mosebæk) (1886–1972) and Marta Kathrine Børsum (1888–1952).
He studied at the Norwegian National Academy of Craft and Art Industry under  August Eiebakke and Eivind Nielsen 1929-31 and the 
Norwegian National Academy of Fine Arts   under Axel Revold and Per Krohg 1931–33. From 1949 to 1950 he lived in Nice and from 1963 they traveled to France annually.

In 1946 he had his first major solo exhibition. He worked as illustrator for Arbeidermagasinet, and served as headmaster at the Norwegian National Academy of Craft and Art Industry  (Statens håndverks- og kunstindustriskole in Oslo from 1947 to 1969. From 1995 he ran his own drawing school together with Hans Normann Dahl.

He is represented at the National Gallery of Norway with illustrations and paintings.

ESelected Works

 Camilleplukkerskene, Oil / Canvas, private collection
 Duer, Lithograph, 52.00 x 59.00 cm, private collection
 Kvinne Med Fugl, Indian ink, 30.50 x 25.00 cm, private collection
 Kvinner Med Hodekurver, Oil / Canvas, 60.00 x 73.00 cm, private collection
 Kvinneportrett, Oil / Canvas, 91.00 x 48.00 cm,  private collection
 Liggende Akt, Watercolour, 20.00 x 28.00 cm, private collection
 Mor & Barn, Oil / Canvas, 40.00 x 34.00 cm, private collection
 Par, Painting, 28.00 x 20.00 cm, private collection
 Par Med Fugl, Painting, 28.00 x 20.00 cm, private collection
 Sittende Kvinne, Painting, 26.00 x 19.00 cm, private collection
 Tulla, Lithograph, 18.50 x 25.00 cm, private collection

References

1910 births
2001 deaths
People from Kongsberg
Oslo National Academy of the Arts alumni
Academic staff of the Oslo National Academy of the Arts
Norwegian illustrators
20th-century Norwegian painters
Norwegian male painters
20th-century Norwegian male artists